Crackle, formerly named Grouper and Sony Crackle, is an American video streaming service founded in 2004. The service was purchased by Sony Pictures in 2006 and was renamed as Crackle. In 2018, the name was changed to Sony Crackle. Eric Berger served as the general manager of Crackle from 2008 to 2019. Sony sold a majority stake to Chicken Soup for the Soul in March 2019, and the name was changed back to Crackle. As of January 2022, Crackle has about 40 million monthly active users.

History
Grouper was founded in 2004 by Josh Felser, Dave Samuel, Mike Sitrin, and Aviv Aiyal. Later, Sony purchased it in August 2006 for $65 million. In July 2007, Sony rebranded Grouper as Crackle, a multi-platform video-entertainment network and studio, and appointed Berger to oversee Crackle in late 2008.

In March 2011 under Berger's tenure, Crackle launched its streaming services on Bravia TVs, the Playstation 3, Roku boxes, and Sony Blu-ray players. It also partnered with Xbox Live and added its content to Xbox 360. 

In June 2013, it released an app for the Blackberry 10 platform and added its content to the Apple TV set-top box.
In January 2012, Crackle added Animax to its content for users in the US and Canada, and later by the end of 2013, Animax branding was removed.

In Australia, Crackle became the free-to-air home of Sony's popular American soap opera Days of Our Lives, following the end of its run with the television broadcaster Nine Network.

On April 1, 2014, Sony Pictures Television ceased its Crackle operations in the UK and Australia. 

In the same month, Crackle announced the making of Sports Jeopardy, a sports-themed version of the game show Sports Jeopardy!, hosted by Dan Patrick, and a new feature called "Always On," an ad-supported internet television channel similar to Vevo TV.

On April 14, 2015, Crackle announced a new feature called "Always On"; an ad-supported, internet television channel similar to Vevo TV. Crackle also announced its first animated series, SuperMansion; their first hour-long scripted drama, The Art of More; and Joe Dirt 2: Beautiful Loser, a sequel to 2001's Joe Dirt.

On October 8, 2015, Crackle premiered SuperMansion, a stop-motion animated comedy television series created by Matthew Senreich and Zeb Wells. The series stars the voices of Bryan Cranston, Heidi Gardner, Tucker Gilmore, Keegan-Michael Key, Tom Root, Yvette Nicole Brown, Wells, and Jillian Bell.

In 2017, Crackle announced the platform had greenlit an original drama, The Oath, written and created by former Los Angeles County Sheriff's deputy Joe Halpin. Executive produced by Curtis "50 Cent" Jackson and his G-Unit Film & Television Inc., the drama series stars Sean Bean, Ryan Kwanten, Cory Hardrict, Arlen Escarpeta, Katrina Law, and J.J. Soria, and premiered on March 8, 2018.

In November 2017, Berger became Sony Pictures Television Networks' chief digital officer in addition to his role as GM at Crackle.

In the spring of 2018, the company’s name was changed to Sony Crackle, and then a few months later in 2019, Sony sold the majority stakes of Sony Crackle to Chicken Soup for the Soul Entertainment and the name was changed to Crackle again.

Later on December 15, 2020, Sony sold its remaining stake in Crackle, giving full control to Chicken Soup for the Soul Entertainment.

Programming
Crackle is owned by Chicken Soup for the Soul Entertainment. Other Crackle Plus VOD platforms include Popcornflix (AVOD), Truli, and Pivotshare (SVOD platform). Crackle features programming in the following genres: action, comedy, crime, drama, horror, and sci-fi.

Original programming

Movie and TV library
Crackle features films and TV shows, some exclusive, mainly from Sony Pictures and its subsidiaries, including Columbia Pictures, TriStar Pictures, Screen Gems, Sony Pictures Classics, and Sony Pictures Worldwide Acquisitions.

Crackle also features the "Crackle Original" series, including On the Ropes, Going from Broke, Hidden Heroes, The Oath, and Snatch. Crackle's content changes each month as titles are added and taken down.

Content providers

 A24
 A&E Networks
 BBC Worldwide
 CBS Media Ventures
 Constantin Film
 Discotek Media
 Disney-ABC Domestic Television
 Entertainment One
 Epic Pictures
 ErosSTX
 FilmRise
 Fremantle
 Gaumont Film Company
 Hallmark Entertainment
 Lionsgate
 Magnolia Pictures
 MarVista Entertainment
 Metro-Goldwyn-Mayer
 NBCUniversal Television Distribution
 Nordisk Film
 Oscilloscope Laboratories
 Samuel Goldwyn Films
 Screen Media Ventures
 Shout! Factory
 Sony Pictures
 Tribeca Film
 Universal Pictures
 Warner Bros.
 Walt Disney Studios Motion Pictures

Availability
While it was Sony Crackle, it was available in 21 countries and in three languages: English, Portuguese, and Spanish. Currently, Crackle is only available in the US. Crackle was launched in Canada in September 2010. In late 2015, several of the service's original series were made available only through the local services Crave TV and Shomi. Following the closure of Shomi in the fall of 2016, new productions continued to be released exclusively on Crave TV, as well as Amazon Prime Video and Super Channel (Canada). 

Crackle's Canadian operations were shut down on June 28, 2018, and its content was moved to Bell Media's CTV Movies and CTV Throwback services. Despite Crackle being a Sony owned service, the successor CTV app has not launched on Sony's PlayStation or Smart TV platforms, although it has become available on Microsoft's Xbox One console and Samsung's Smart TVs.

As of late 2016, Crackle in Latin America was only available as an ad-free paid service. Subscribers were required to have a pay-TV service provider that had partnered with Sony Crackle in order to access the service. Crackle was discontinued in Latin America on April 30, 2019.

See also
 List of streaming media services
 Video on demand
 Popcornflix
 SonyLIV
 FunimationNow
 Wakanim
 Hooq
 Tubi
 Netflix
 Peacock

References

External links 
 

Advertising video on demand
Former video hosting services
2019 mergers and acquisitions
Internet properties established in 2004
Windows software
Former Sony subsidiaries